The Hoddle Bridge is an arch bridge that carries Punt Road over the Yarra River between Richmond and South Yarra in Melbourne, Australia. It is a five-lane road bridge with narrow footpaths on either side. It is of continuous reinforced concrete T-beam construction with five segmental arched spans, supported on transverse piers, and linked by concrete cross-beams.

History
Under agreement from the Melbourne City Council and the Country Roads Board, the board began construction of the bridge began in late 1937, with tenders for sub-contracted work (involving driving 240 concrete piles and the construction of four river piers) released. During 1937, the contractor drove all the piles and completed one pier, but owing to the slow rate of progress the contract was concluded and the work completed by direct labour under the Board's engineers. As no satisfactory tender was received for the construction of the abutments and super-structure, the work put in hand by the Board by direct labour. Total cost was A£77,009.

Before construction of the bridge began, the nearest crossing for traffic was at the Morell Bridge, a half-mile downstream. Traffic conditions at this narrow bridge was very congested, as a considerable proportion of traffic which came down from the north along Punt Road was compelled to swing to the west to cross the river and thence again to the east for an extra mile. Comparisons of traffic measurements taken in the vicinity before and after the bridge had opened had shown not only a decrease in total distance in crossing the river, but an increase of traffic of 17.38%. 

The bridge was originally referred to as Punt Road Bridge, but was named after the surveyor Robert Hoddle upon opening by the Premier of Victoria Albert Dunstan on 22 December 1938. It replaced an earlier footbridge, which in turn had replaced a punt service.

References

Bridges in Melbourne
Bridges over the Yarra River
1938 establishments in Australia
Bridges completed in 1938
Concrete bridges in Australia
Buildings and structures in the City of Melbourne (LGA)
Transport in the City of Melbourne (LGA)
Transport in the City of Yarra
Buildings and structures in the City of Yarra
Transport in the City of Stonnington
Buildings and structures in the City of Stonnington